is a Japanese voice actor from Saitama Prefecture attached to Aoni Production. He has played a large number of supporting and minor roles, including heroes, villains, serious and joke characters. He performed alongside Kōji Totani numerous times and voiced some of his ongoing roles after his death in honor of him. He took over the role of narrating Beat Takeshi no TV Tackle after the death of Daisuke Gōri.

Roles

Television animation
1997
Chūka Ichiban! (Villager #B, spectator #A)
1998
Mamotte Shugogetten (Southern troop)
Nintama Rantarō (Tsukai's Papa, Watchman #A, Man #A, Guest, Express Home Delivery Man, Dokutake Ninja)
Yu-Gi-Oh! (Group member)
2003
Firestorm (Jess, Narration, Duvarie, United Nations secretary)
Detective Conan (Detective, bus driver)
Sonic X (Tanaka, King Boom Boo, Head of Intelligence government official, E-102 Gamma)
2004
Bobobo-bo Bo-bobo (Robo Yamada's Face)
Kidō Senshi Gundam SEED Destiny (Takao Schreiber)
2007
GeGeGe no Kitarō (fifth series) (Okutama Cemetery station master, Producer)
Shining Tears X Wind (Raihi)
2008
Golgo 13 (Tony)
2009
Senjō no Valkyria (Aristocrat #A)
2010
SD Gundam Sangokuden Brave Battle Warriors (Kougai Gouf)

OVA
Kidō Senshi Gundam SEED C.E. 73: Stargazer (Royora)
Saint Seiya: Meiō Hades Jyūnikyū Hen (Heracles Seiza no Algethi)
Sakura Taisen: New York, New York (Howard Carter)

Theatrical animation
Crayon Shin-chan: Arashi wo Yobu! Yuuhi no Kasukabe Boys (Security)
Kidō Senshi Z Gundam: A New Translation -Hoshi wo Tsugusha- (Alexandria Captain)
Steamboy (Additional voice)

Video games
Battle Fantasia (Deathbringer)
Dragon Ball Z Sparking! Neo (Kui (succeeding Kōji Totani), Freeza soldier #1)
Dragon Ball Z Sparking! Meteor (Kui (succeeding Kōji Totani), Freeza soldier #1)
Kidō Senshi Gundam: MS Sensen 0079 (Soldier)
Kidō Senshi Gundam: Spirits of Zion (Alpha A. Bait)
Metal Gear series
Metal Gear Acid 2 (Golab)
Metal Gear Solid (Genome soldier #B (Johnny Sasaki))
Metal Gear Solid: Portable Ops (High government official)
Metal Gear Solid 2: Sons of Liberty (Johnny Sasaki)
Metal Gear Solid 3: Snake Eater (Johnny)
Rockman Zero 4 (Heat Gemblem)
SD Gundam G Generation (Alpha A. Bait, Ethan Raiya, Gady Kinzey)
Shining Wind (Raihi)
Soulcalibur III (Custom character: Young Man #2)
Tales of Fandom Vol.1 (Clayton)

Drama CD
Tales of Destiny (Dustoff Draiden)

Dubbing roles
Superman: The Animated Series (Kanto)
Sahara (Imam, sailor, soldier, guard)

Tokusatsu
Chō Ninja Tai Inazuma! (Mushigon)
Super Sentai series
Engine Sentai Go-onger (Savage Land Barbaric Machine Beast Boring Banki (ep. 8))
Hyakujū Sentai Gaoranger (Mōjūtsukai Org (voice) (ep. 38))
Ninpū Sentai Hurricaneger (Metal Ninja Tekkotsumeba (ep. 12)　
Tokumei Sentai Go-Busters  (Kuwagataloid (voice) (ep. 45 - 46))
Kamen Rider × Super Sentai: Super Hero Taisen (Kamen Rider Kuuga, Doukoku Chimatsuri)

Other
Beat Takeshi no TV Tackle (TV Asahi) (Narration (succeeding Daisuke Gōri))
FNS Chikyū Tokusō Tai Dybastar (Maru-san)
Hikkuri Hōritsu Ryokōsha (NHK) (Narration)

External links
Aoni Production profile
 

Japanese male video game actors
Japanese male voice actors
Living people
Male voice actors from Saitama Prefecture
1973 births
Aoni Production voice actors